The Figurehead may refer to:

The Figurehead, song by the Cure from the album Pornography, 1982
The Figurehead (film), 1920 American silent drama film